Catherine-Henriette Bellier, baroness de Beauvais (Poitou, 1614 – 7 June 1689 in Arrou), was a French courtier, best remembered as the first mistress of King Louis XIV of France.

Biography
She was the daughter of Martin Bellier, a porter, and married Baron Pierre de Beauvais. She became première femme de Chambre to the French Queen, Anne of Austria, mother of King Louis XIV. During her time as première femme de Chambre, she had the intimate duty of giving the Queen her enema. 

She is described as intelligent, plotting and a trusted companion of the dowager queen regent. Despite being described as ugly, she had several love affairs, such as with Henri-Louis de Gondrin, Archbishop of Sens. 

In 1652, Queen Anne was worried about the possibility of her teenaged son, Louis XIV, being plagued by the same type of "sexual dysfunction" that his father seemed to have suffered from. She encouraged Bellier to deflower the 15 year old king in order to ensure that he was capable of producing heirs. Their relationship lasted for two years, after which the queen dowager awarded Bellier an estate and a pension.

As it was French custom to imitate the king, Catherine Bellier's sexual favors suddenly became high-demand. As Bellier aged though, she became overweight, her looks faded, and she fell into debt. By the time her husband died in 1647, she was destitute and was forced to live as a renter in the Hôtel de Beauvais.

Legacy
King Louis XIV funded the Hôtel de Beauvais in the Marais in Paris as a reward to Bellier.

She is portrayed by Valérie Thoumire in the French-produced television series drama Versailles.

Sources

 Oliver Mallick: « Le principal passage pour aller à la ville de Dom Anna » : Mme de Beauvais et la charge de première femme de chambre de la reine (1646-1666), in: Femmes à la cour de France. Charges et fonctions (XVe-XIXe siècle), ed. by Caroline zum Kolk, Kathleen Wilson-Chevalier, Villeneuve d’Ascq: Septentrion, 2018, p. 107-125.
 L'Hôtel de Beauvais, hrsgg. von der Association pour la Sauvegarde et la Mise en valeur du Paris historique, Paris o.J.

French courtiers
1638 births
1708 deaths
Mistresses of Louis XIV
French baronesses
Household of Anne of Austria
Maids